The 2017 Scottish Cup Final was the 132nd final of the Scottish Cup and the final of the 2016–17 Scottish Cup, the most prestigious knockout football competition in Scotland. The match took place at Hampden Park on 27 May 2017 and was contested by Celtic and Aberdeen.

The fixture was a repeat of the finals in 1937, 1954 and 1967 won by Celtic, and in 1970, 1984 and 1990 won by Aberdeen. It was also a repeat of the final of the Scottish League Cup played six months earlier, which Celtic won 3–0.

Celtic won the game 2–1 to complete an undefeated domestic treble.

Route to the final 
Aberdeen eliminated holders Hibernian in one semi-final to reach their first Scottish Cup final since 1990. In the other semi-final, Celtic eliminated Rangers in an Old Firm encounter, the first time they had beaten their Glasgow rivals at this stage of the competition since 1925, at the seventh attempt.

Match

Summary
Jonny Hayes opened the scoring for Aberdeen in the 9th minute with a low left foot volley from seven yards out after a corner from the right by Niall McGinn. Two minutes later Stuart Armstrong made it 1-1 with a left foot shot to the right corner from just outside the penalty area. In the 92nd minute, Tom Rogic got the winning goal when he received the ball 40 yards out and made his way into the right side of the penalty area before clipping the ball with his right foot over the goalkeeper from three yards out from a tight angle.

Details

Match rules
 90 minutes
 30 minutes of extra time if necessary
 Penalty shoot-out if scores still level
 Seven named substitutes
 Maximum of three substitutions in normal time (a fourth substitution may be made in extra time)

References 

Scottish Cup Finals
Scottish Cup Final 2017
Scottish Cup Final 2017
Scottish Cup Final
Scottish Cup Final 2017
Scottish Cup Final 2017
Scottish Cup Final